DAAS Bootleg – Live in Edinburgh is an official live bootleg recording released by the Australian comedy trio the Doug Anthony All Stars in 1994.  It was recorded in August 1993 at the Pleasance Theatre Assembly Rooms in Edinburgh and sold at the group's live gigs.

Track listing
"Catholic Girls on LSD" - 2:34
"Stairway to Heaven" - 2:39
"Summer Lovin'" - 4:32
"Satan I" - 2:44
"Viva Las Vegas" - 2:27
"Satan II" - 1:53
"Mexican Hitler" - 3:40
"Virgin Mary (Joseph Was A Lousy Fuck)" - 8:12
"I Fuck Dogs" - 3:37
"Wimmin's Literature" - 5:38
"I Heard It Through the Grapevine" - 4:36
"Paul's Poem" - 4:23
"Satan III" - 6:52
"I Hate the French" - 7:38
"Satan IV" - 7:04
"My Way" - 4:52

Doug Anthony All Stars albums
1994 live albums